Legion of Merit may also refer to:

Legion of Merit is about the United States decoration. 
Legion of Merit of Chile, for the Chilean order.
Legion of Merit (Rhodesia), for the Rhodesian order.
Pour le Mérite, known informally as the Blue Max (German: Blauer Max), was the German Kingdom of Prussia's highest order of merit (German: Verdienstorden).